= Constituency NM-371 =

Constituency of the Punjabi Provincial Legislature, Pakistan

W-371
- Minority Reserved constituency for the Provincial Assembly of Punjab

Current constituency

NM-371 is a Minority reserved Constituency in the Provincial Assembly of Punjab.

== See also ==
- Punjab, Pakistan
